Neolitsea dealbata, also known as hairy-leaved bolly gum, is a shrub or tree, in the family Lauraceae, which is native to Australia.

Description
The species grows up to 12 metres high. It has glossy, elliptic to obovate leaves which have whitish undersides. Younger leaves and branchlets are covered with brown hairs. It has small, 2 mm long flowers followed by rounded, black fruits which are about 8 mm in diameter and ripen from mid-autumn to early winter (April to June in Australia).

Fungus species Phyllachora queenslandica is found on Neolitsea dealbata.

Taxonomy
The species was first formally described by Robert Brown in 1810 who gave it the name Tetranthera dealbata''.

Distribution
The species is an understorey species found in rainforests in New South Wales and Queensland.

References

Other sources
PlantNET - New south Wales Flora Online: Neolitsea dealbata

Flora of New South Wales
Flora of Queensland
Laurales of Australia
dealbata
Taxa named by Robert Brown (botanist, born 1773)